Cryptofusus cryptocarinatus is a species of sea snail, a marine gastropod mollusk in the family Fasciolariidae, the spindle snails, the tulip snails and their allies.

Description

Distribution
This marine species can be found along New Zealand.

References

External links

Fasciolariidae
Gastropods described in 1956